MYV may refer to:
 Yuba County Airport, an airport located near Marysville, California, United States
 Erzya language, a language spoken in parts of the Republic of Mordovia and in adjacent regions in Russia